The decade of the 1510s in music (years 1510–1519) involved some significant events.

Events 
1513: Jacques Champion replaces Noel Bauldeweyn as magister cantorum at St Rombouts, Mechelen.
 1517:
 March – Heinrich Finck sends greetings from Mühldorf, Bavaria, to the humanist Joachim Vadian.
 April 15 – Juan García de Basurto is hired as a singer by the cathedral chapter of Tarazona, at an annual salary of 1200 sueldos.
 June – Silvestro Ganassi dal Fontego joins the pifferi of the Venetian government as a "contralto".
 Sixt Dietrich is forced to leave Freiburg because of debts, but in November is appointed  by the cathedral chapter in Konstanz.
 1518: Composer Ludwig Senfl loses a toe in a hunting accident.

Publications 

 1511: 
Franciscus Bossinensis –  (Venice: Ottaviano Petrucci)
Arnolt Schlick – , the first treatise on organ-making in German
Sebastian Virdung – , published in Basel, the first European treatise entirely devoted to the subject of musical instruments.
 1512: Arnolt Schlick – , a collection of organ and lute pieces
 1515: Antoine de Févin – Masses (Fossombrone: Ottaviano Petrucci), also includes one mass by Pierre de la Rue (Quarti toni)
 1517:
 Andreas Ornithoparchus – Musicae activae micrologus (Leipzig).
 Sebastian z Felsztyna –  (Kraków: Johann Haller).
 1518: 
The Medici Codex (manuscript)
Franchinus Gaffurius – . Milan.

Compositions 
 1510: Josquin des Prez assembles or composes , a musical setting of the Ordinary of the Mass, and it becomes the most popular of his masses in the 16th century.
 1513: Heinrich Isaac – , motet celebrating the meeting in December of Maximilian I's Chancellor, Cardinal Lang, and the newly elected Pope Leo X
 1514: Costanzo Festa – , funeral ode for Anne of Brittany, Queen of France
 1519: Adrian Willaert – , setting of Horace's fifth epistle, for four voices

Births

1510
 Juan Bermudo, Spanish music theorist (died 1565)
 Antonio de Cabezón, Spanish composer and organist of the Renaissance (died 1566)
 probable – Loys Bourgeois, French composer, famous for his Protestant hymn tunes (died c.1561)
 probable – Gian Domenico del Giovane da Nola, Neapolitan composer, famous for his villanescas and villanellas in the Neapolitan style (died 1592)

1511
 date unknown – Nicola Vicentino, Italian music theorist and composer (died 1575/1576)

1513
February 14 – Domenico Ferrabosco, Italian composer and singer (died 1574)
May 16 – Antonfrancesco Doni, Italian writer, academic and musician (died 1574)

1516
 probable – Cipriano de Rore, Flemish composer (died 1565)

1517
 January 17 – Antonio Scandello, Italian composer and instrumentalist
 January 31 or March 22 – Gioseffo Zarlino, Venetian theorist (died 1590)

Deaths 
 1513: January – Hans Folz, German Meistersinger, barber, and surgeon (born ?before 1440)
 1517: March 26 – Heinrich Isaac, Franco-Flemish composer (born c.1445)

References

16th century in music
Music